The 2014–15 Gibraltar Premier Division (known as the Argus Insurance Premier Division for sponsorship reasons) was the 116th season of the national amateur football league in Gibraltar since its establishment - the highest level of football in Gibraltar. The league was contested by eight clubs, like last year, a requirement for entry into UEFA competitions. Lincoln Red Imps are the reigning champions, sealing a record 20th title last season.

Teams

After the 2013–14 season, Gibraltar Phoenix were relegated from the league without registering a single point. FC Britannia XI were promoted as champions of the Gibraltar Second Division.

Personnel and kits

Note: Flags indicate national team as has been defined under FIFA eligibility rules. Players may hold more than one non-FIFA nationality.

Managerial changes

League table

Results 
Teams in the 2014–15 season played each other three times, with the season starting 19 September 2014. For each match a home and an away team was named, however all matches were played at Victoria Stadium

Matches 1–14
Teams played each other twice.

Matches 15–21
Teams played each other once.

Premier Division play-off
In the previous Gibraltar Premier Division season, promotion and relegation deciding a place in the Premier Division for the following year was determined by a play-off match. A play-off match at the end of the current season was planned to be played between the 7th placed team from the 2014–15 Premier Division and the 2nd placed from the 2014–15 Second Division. The winner of the match would have earned a spot in the 2015–16 Gibraltar Premier Division. However, no relegation match took place as the Premier Division expands to 10 teams for next season.

Top goalscorers

References

External links
Season at soccerway.com
Gibraltar Football Association

Gibraltar Premier Division seasons
Gib
1